Third Avenue is a street in the New York City borough of Brooklyn. It runs parallel to Fourth Avenue for most of its length, and it also runs under the Gowanus Expressway from the Prospect Expressway to 65th Street. It has been mostly industrial for most of its existence, though the stretch of Third Avenue from Prospect Expressway to Downtown Brooklyn has recently undergone gentrification. 

The Third Avenue streetcar line formerly ran on Third Avenue from Fort Hamilton to the Brooklyn Bridge. The  Fifth Avenue elevated line ran above Third Avenue in Sunset Park and Bay Ridge. The B37 bus currently runs on the street from Atlantic/Flatbush Avenues to Shore Road in Bay Ridge.

Notable structures on Third Avenue include the Coignet Building and the Somers Brothers Tinware Factory, two New York City designated landmarks at the intersection with Third Street.

References

External links
Forgotten NY
Forgotten NY

Bay Ridge, Brooklyn
Gowanus, Brooklyn
03
Sunset Park, Brooklyn